The Dresden Funicular Railway is a funicular in Dresden, Germany, connecting the districts of Loschwitz, near the "Blue Wonder" bridge, and Weisser Hirsch.

The railway is one of two funicular railways in Dresden, the other being the unusual Schwebebahn Dresden, a suspended monorail. Both lines are operated by the Dresdner Verkehrsbetriebe AG, who also operate the city's tram, bus and ferry networks.

History
Although the construction of the line had been discussed and planned since 1873, the permit to build the railway was not issued until 1893.  The railway was opened on October 26, 1895, and was originally run by a steam engine.

In 1910 the line was converted to run on electricity, and in 1912 its operation was transferred to the Dresden municipal tramways, whose successors still operate it. During the bombing of Dresden on the 13 February 1945, the lower station of the funicular was destroyed. However the lines cars had been moved for safety into the line's tunnels and survived.

Major renewals took place in 1978 and 1993.  On January 6, 2014, the line was again closed for a major refurbishment of both the cars and the line.  The refurbishment is expected to be completed by April, 2014 and to cost €350,000.

Operation
The funicular operates between 06:30 and 21:00 on weekdays, and between 09:00 and 21:00 at weekends and public holidays. During operating hours there are between four and six journeys per hour in each direction.

The line has the following technical parameters:

Gallery

See also 
 List of funicular railways

References

External links
 
 Standseilbahn page from Dresdner Verkehrsbetriebe web site (in German)

Transport in Dresden
Railway lines in Saxony
Tourist attractions in Dresden
Dresden, Standseilbahn
Metre gauge railways in Germany
Railway lines opened in 1895
Dresdner Verkehrsbetriebe